Emplocia lassippa is a species of moth of the family Geometridae first described by Herbert Druce in 1890. It is found in Colombia.

References

Moths described in 1890
Ennominae